Limopsis is a genus of bivalves belonging to the family Limopsidae.

The genus has cosmopolitan distribution.

Species

Species:

Limopsis abyssicola 
Limopsis affinis 
Limopsis aguilari

References

Limopsidae
Bivalve genera